Kaplow is a surname. Notable people with the surname include:

Herb Kaplow (1927–2013), American television news correspondent
Lawrence Kaplow, American television writer and producer
Liz Kaplow, American communications executive and entrepreneur
Robert Kaplow (born 1954), American writer and educator